The 1950 Norwegian Football Cup was the 45th season of the Norwegian annual knockout football tournament. The tournament was open for all members of NFF, except those from Northern Norway. The final was played at Ullevaal Stadion in Oslo on 22 October 1950, and was contested by five-time former winners Fredrikstad and the two-time former winners Brann. Fredrikstad won the final 3–0, and secured their sixth title. Sarpsborg were the defending champions, but were eliminated by Fredrikstad in the semi-final.

The 10 teams that were involved in the series final and qualification for promotion to the Hovedserien (Fram (Larvik), Fredrikstad, Brann, Lisleby, Stavanger, Hamar, Odd, Kristiansund, Kvik (Trondheim) and Geithus) therefore got a walkover in the first and second round.

First round

|-
|colspan="3" style="background-color:#97DEFF"|Replay

|}

Second round

|-
|colspan="3" style="background-color:#97DEFF"|Replay

|-
|colspan="3" style="background-color:#97DEFF"|2nd replay

|}

Third round

|colspan="3" style="background-color:#97DEFF"|30 July 1950

|}

Fourth round

|colspan="3" style="background-color:#97DEFF"|27 August 1950

|}

Quarter-finals

|colspan="3" style="background-color:#97DEFF"|1 October 1950

|-
|colspan="3" style="background-color:#97DEFF"|Replay: 4 October 1950

|}

Semi-finals

|colspan="3" style="background-color:#97DEFF"|8 October 1950

|}

Final

See also
1949–50 Norwegian Main League
1950 in Norwegian football

References

Norwegian Football Cup seasons
Norway
Cup